Mogens Pedersen (born 27 February 1944) is a Danish rower. He competed in the men's coxless four event at the 1968 Summer Olympics.

References

1944 births
Living people
Danish male rowers
Olympic rowers of Denmark
Rowers at the 1968 Summer Olympics
Sportspeople from Frederiksberg